FireStation  is a Pakistani live interactive show. The entire product was conceptualized by AAG TV and the first episode was aired on 21 June 2010.

VJ's
Here is a list of the VJ's of FireStation of the latest season held by AAG TV

 Ali Safina
 Sanam Jung
 Ali Ansari
 Amafah
 Zarmeena
 Raheel Butt
 Yasir Jalbani
 Marium Ansari
 Rehab
 Saad

Production and execution
The entire concept of the show was executed and produced by Umar Amanullah and Executive Producer at AAG TV.

Interactive content
The entire interactive content of the show such as polls, contests, and activities on www.aag.tv was brain child of Ali Tim and Samia Baleegh.

Pakistani television series
2010 Pakistani television series debuts